North Midlands 4 was a tier 10 English Rugby Union league with teams from Birmingham, Herefordshire, Shropshire and Worcestershire taking part.  Promoted teams moved up to North Midlands 3 and there was no relegation.  After five seasons North Midlands 4 was cancelled at the end of the 1991–92 campaign with teams transferred into either North Midlands 2 or North Midlands 3 depending on final league ranking.

Original teams

When league rugby began in 1987 this division contained the following teams:

Bewdley
Birchfield
Birmingham Civil Service
Bromyard
Ross-on-Wye
Tenbury
Upton-upon-Severn
Veseyans
West Midlands Police
Witton

North Midlands 4 honours

Number of league titles

Bournville (1)
Old Moseleians (1)
Ross-on-Wye (1)
Tenbury (1)
West Midlands Police (1)

Notes

See also
North Midlands 1
North Midlands 2
North Midlands 3
Midlands RFU
North Midlands RFU
English rugby union system
Rugby union in England

References

External links
 North Midlands RFU website

10
Rugby union in Herefordshire
Rugby union in Shropshire
Rugby union in Worcestershire
Sport in Birmingham, West Midlands